EUC Construction – El Hazek is a leading Egyptian company based in Cairo, Egypt.  It was established in 1979, and has covered an array of projects across all Egypt and the Persian Gulf region.

External links
 

Companies based in Cairo
Construction and civil engineering companies of Egypt
Construction and civil engineering companies established in 1979
Egyptian companies established in 1979